Alexander Yevseyenkov (sometimes listed as Alexandr Yevseyenkov) (born 2 October 1985) is a Russian professional ice hockey player who is currently playing for HC Lada Togliatti in the Supreme Hockey League (VHL).

After two seasons in his second tenure with Severstal Cherepovets, Yevseyenkov left the club as a free agent prior to the 2018–19 season, and signed a two-year contract with Russian club, HC Vityaz of the KHL, on May 4, 2018.

References

External links

1985 births
Living people
HC Kunlun Red Star players
HC Neftekhimik Nizhnekamsk players
People from Lyuberetsky District
Russian ice hockey defencemen
Severstal Cherepovets players
Torpedo Nizhny Novgorod players
HC Vityaz players
Sportspeople from Moscow Oblast